This is list of archives in Iceland.

Archives in Iceland 

 National Archives of Iceland
 Reykjavík Municipal Archives

See also 

 List of archives
 List of museums in Iceland
 Culture of Iceland

External links 

 
Archives
Iceland
Archives